The Group F of the 2002 FIFA World Cup lasted from 2 to 12 June 2002. Sweden won the group, and advanced to the second round, along with England. The two sides were level on points, but Sweden won the tie-break on goals scored, and so won the group with England in second place. Argentina and Nigeria failed to advance. Group F was considered by several commentators to be a 'group of death' due to the high rankings, and World Cup records of the teams in the group.

Standings

Sweden advanced to play Senegal (runner-up of Group A) in the round of 16.
England advanced to play Denmark (winner of Group A) in the round of 16.

Matches
All times local (UTC+9)

Argentina vs Nigeria

England vs Sweden

Sweden vs Nigeria

Argentina vs England

Sweden vs Argentina

Nigeria vs England

References

External links
 Results

F
England at the 2002 FIFA World Cup
Sweden at the 2002 FIFA World Cup
Argentina at the 2002 FIFA World Cup
Nigeria at the 2002 FIFA World Cup